The name HMNZS Monowai may apply to the following ships of the Royal New Zealand Navy:

 , an armed merchant cruiser commissioned 1940–1943
 , a hydrographic survey vessel commissioned 1977–1997

Royal New Zealand Navy ship names